John Medina (born September 5, 1985) is a Filipino character actor best known for playing James Ocampo in the 2012 hit primetime teleserye Walang Hanggan, Agustin Magdiwang in Juan dela Cruz, and  Billy Guzman in  FPJ's Ang Probinsyano on ABS-CBN.
 
Contrary to popular belief, he is not related to fellow actors Pen Medina, Ping Medina and Alex Medina.

Career
Medina started his career as commercial model and bit player. During this period, he met Coco Martin. The two would be reunited in Tayong Dalawa on ABS-CBN and since then would be part of various series starred by Martin for the network. He first played body double to Martin in Minsan Lang Kita Iibigin before landing his biggest role up to that point, that of James Ocampo in Walang Hanggan. The role came as Medina's big break, with his character's name becoming a top trending topic on Twitter on March 13, 2012.

Medina would star in further projects with Martin including Juan dela Cruz and Ikaw Lamang before becoming one of the "CIDG Boys" in the longest running action series Ang Probinsyano.

Medina is also handled by the same manager, Biboy Arboleda, as Coco Martin. Medina is active in most Dreamscape Entertainment projects headed by Deo Endrinal.

Filmography

Movies

Television

References

External links

Filipino male television actors
1985 births
Living people
ABS-CBN personalities
Filipino male film actors